Majdine is a bio-active isolate of Vinca minor and Vinca herbacea.

References

External links
 Apoptotic, antioxidant and antiradical effects of majdine and isomajdine from Vinca herbacea Waldst. and kit

Alkaloids found in Apocynaceae
Methyl esters
Methoxy compounds